Benjamin "Ben" Johnson (born 7 January 1983 in Noosa) is an Australian former professional cyclist.

Major results
2006
 8th Omloop van het Houtland

References

1983 births
Living people
Australian male cyclists